Heterophyes is a genus of trematodes, or fluke worms, in the family Heterophyidae.

Species
Species within the genus Heterophyes include:
 Heterophyes aequalis Looss, 1902
 Heterophyes bucalis Marco del Pont, 1926
 Heterophyes dispar Looss, 1902
 Heterophyes fraterna (Looss, 1894)
 Heterophyes heroni El-Ezz, Tantawy, Mahdy & El-Massry, 2001
 Heterophyes heterophyes (Siebold, 1853)
 Heterophyes inops Looss, 1902
 Heterophyes larii Zhao, 1991
 Heterophyes nocens Onji & Nishio, 1916

References

External links

 

Heterophyidae
Trematode genera
Taxa named by Thomas Spencer Cobbold